Uştalqışlaq is a village and municipality in the Ismailli Rayon of Azerbaijan. It has a population of 233.

References

Populated places in Ismayilli District